Berkåk is the administrative centre of Rennebu Municipality in Trøndelag county, Norway. It is located in the Orkladalen valley along the river Orkla. The European route E6 highway runs through the village, as does the Dovrebanen railway line which stops at Berkåk Station. Berkåk Church is also located in the village. 

Along the E6 highway south of the village, is the Kunstsenteret Birka, the national centre for arts and crafts. Every August, since 1986, the village hosts the large fair called Rennebumartnan. 

In the 1500s and 1600s, the village was named Birckagir, Berckager, and Berchager.  More recently the spelling was Bjerkaager or Bjerkaaker.

Notable residents

Media gallery

References

Villages in Trøndelag
Rennebu